"Everybody" is a song by Swiss Eurodance artist DJ BoBo, released in May 1994 as the fourth and last single from his debut album, Dance With Me (1993). It was very successful in Europe, reaching number-one in Finland, number two in Germany (where it was certified Platinum), and number three in Switzerland. Additionally, it was a top 10 hit in Iceland and the Netherlands, peaking at number eight and ten, respectively. The female vocals are performed by Jennifer Rüesch.

In 2002, DJ BoBo released "Everybody" as a duet with Swedish singer Emilia on his first compilation album, Celebration (2002). And in 2015, a new version of the song, remixed by Mike Candys and featuring Romanian singer Inna, was released.

Critical reception
Alan Jones from Music Week wrote, "Another Euro-smash, this time from Switzerland. A stuttering pop/reggae confection on which BoBo raps, while his anonymous female companion handles the chorus. Highly commercial and certain to register, though probably not as highly as some of the recent Continental contenders." James Hamilton from the RM Dance Update described it as a "Swiss DJ muttered and girl chorused bland Ace of Base-ish jogging pop reggae Euro smash".

Chart performance
"Everybody" was successful on the charts in Europe and remains one of DJ BoBo's biggest hits to date. It peaked at number-one in Finland and was also a top 10 hit in Germany (where it reached number two), Iceland, Lithuania, the Netherlands and Switzerland, as well as on the Eurochart Hot 100, where the single hit number ten in August 1994. Additionally, it was a top 20 hit in Sweden and a top 30 hit in Belgium. In the United Kingdom, "Everybody" was the first song by DJ BoBo to chart there, reaching number 47 in its first week on the UK Singles Chart, on September 18, 1994. But on the UK Dance Singles Chart, it fared better, peaking at number 31. Outside Europe, the song was huge in Israel, where it reached number four. It also charted in Australia, ending up at number 85.

Music video
Directed by Italian director Giacomo De Simone (who had directed music videos for many other Eurodance acts, like Corona, Ice MC and Whigfield) and shot in Porto Venere in Italy, the music video for "Everybody" features DJ BoBo performing the song while driving an old car. Other scenes show the singer singing and dancing with people in the city of Porto Venere. The video was A-listed on Germany's VIVA in July 1994. An official live video from one of DJ BoBo's concerts, where the singer performs "Everybody" on stage, was later published on DJ BoBo's official YouTube channel in August 2009. The video had generated more than 104 million views as of December 2022.

Track listing
 7", UK
"Everybody" (Radio Version) – 3:51
"Let Yourself Be Free" – 4:20

 12", Italy
"Everybody" (4th On the Floor Mix) – 6:12
"Everybody" (Radio Mix) – 3:51
"Everybody" (Tribe Mix) – 3:00
"Let Yourself Be Free" – 4:20
"Everybody" (First Edition) – 3:53

 CD single, France
"Everybody" (Radio Mix) – 3:51
"Everybody" (On the Floor Mix) – 6:13

 CD maxi, Switzerland
"Everybody" (Radio Mix) – 3:51
"Everybody" (4 On the Floor Mix) – 6:12
"Let Yourself Be Free – 4:20
"Everybody" (First Edition) – 3:53

Charts

Weekly charts

Year-end charts

References

1994 singles
1994 songs
DJ BoBo songs
English-language Swiss songs
Music videos directed by Giacomo De Simone
Number-one singles in Finland
Reggae fusion songs
Songs written by DJ BoBo